Algerian Sign Language (French: Langue des signes algérienne (LSA), Tamazight: Tutlayt Tagugamt n Lezzayer, Arabic: لغة الإشارة الجزائرية  
) is the sign language most commonly used in Algeria. It was officially recognized by the Algerian law on the protection and promotion of persons with a disability enacted on May 8, 2002.

It has influenced the deaf community in Oujda in northern Morocco.

References 

Arab sign languages
French Sign Language family
Languages of Algeria
Languages of Morocco
Disability in Algeria